Bryan Patrick Reynolds (born January 27, 1995) is an American professional baseball outfielder for the Pittsburgh Pirates of Major League Baseball (MLB). Reynolds played college baseball for the Vanderbilt Commodores, and the San Francisco Giants selected him with the 59th pick in the 2016 Major League Baseball draft. The Giants traded him to the Pirates in 2018. He made his MLB debut in 2019 and was an All-Star in 2021.

Amateur career
Reynolds attended Brentwood High School in Brentwood, Tennessee and Vanderbilt University, where he played college baseball for the Vanderbilt Commodores.

As a freshman at Vanderbilt in 2014, Reynolds played in 72 games and hit .338/.395/.480 with four home runs and 54 runs batted in (RBI), helping Vanderbilt win the College World Series championship. As a sophomore, he played in 72 games, hitting .318/.388/.462 with five home runs and 49 RBI. After the 2015 season, he played collegiate summer baseball with the Orleans Firebirds of the Cape Cod Baseball League. As a junior, he hit .330/.461/.603 with 13 home runs and 57 RBI.

Professional career

San Francisco Giants
The San Francisco Giants selected Reynolds in the second round of the 2016 MLB draft. He signed and was assigned to the Salem-Keizer Volcanoes, where he made his professional debut. He was later promoted to the Augusta GreenJackets. In 56 total games between Salem-Keizer and Augusta, Reynolds batted .313 with six home runs, 38 RBIs, and an .847 OPS. He spent 2017 with the San Jose Giants where he posted a .312 batting average with ten home runs and 63 RBIs in 121 games. He participated in the 2017 All-Star Futures Game.

Pittsburgh Pirates
On January 15, 2018, the Giants traded Reynolds, Kyle Crick, and $500,000 of international bonus slot money to the Pittsburgh Pirates in exchange for Andrew McCutchen and cash considerations. MLB.com ranked Reynolds as Pittsburgh's sixth best prospect going into the 2018 season. Reynolds began 2018 with the Pirates Double-A team the Altoona Curve. He was placed on the disabled list retroactive to April 9, underwent hand surgery in mid-April, and was activated on May 29. Reynolds played in 88 games for the Curve driving in 46 runs along with a .302 batting average. In 2019 he started the season with the Pirates Triple-A team the Indianapolis Indians.

On April 20, his contract was selected and he was recalled to the major league roster for the first time. He made his major league debut that afternoon versus the San Francisco Giants and recorded his first career hit, a single, off Derek Holland. On April 30, he hit his first major league home run off Texas Rangers' reliever Jesse Chavez. Reynolds began his major league career with a hitting streak of eleven games. He finished the season fourth in National League Rookie of the Year voting, playing in 134 games.

In the pandemic-shortened 2020 season, Reynolds hit .189/.275/.357 with seven home runs and 19 RBIs in 55 games. His performance improved significantly the following season: he was one of two Pirates, along with Adam Frazier to play in the 2021 All-Star Game, where he started in center field and batted eighth. He finished the 2021 season hitting .302/.390/.522 with 24 home runs and 90 RBIs. He tied for the major league lead with eight triples.

On April 14, 2022, Reynolds signed a two-year contract worth $13.5 million with the Pittsburgh Pirates.

Personal life
Reynolds is a Christian. Reynolds and his wife, Blair, had their first child, a son, in August 2020. They reside in the Nashville area.

References

External links

Vanderbilt Commodores bio

1995 births
Living people
Baseball players from Baltimore
Major League Baseball outfielders
Pittsburgh Pirates players
Vanderbilt Commodores baseball players
Orleans Firebirds players
Salem-Keizer Volcanoes players
Augusta GreenJackets players
San Jose Giants players
Altoona Curve players
Surprise Saguaros players
Indianapolis Indians players